Soviet archaeology may refer to:

 Archaeology of the Soviet Union
 Sovetskaya arkheologiya, an academic journal published from 1957 to 1992
 Marxist archaeology, the dominant school of archaeological thought in the Soviet Union